Anthony Brooks Firestone (born June 18, 1939) is an American businessman and politician.

The son of Leonard Firestone, a grandson of Harvey Samuel Firestone and Idabelle Smith, and a nephew of Harvey Firestone, Jr., he was educated at The Webb School, and graduated from Columbia College with an A.B in economics in 1961. He worked for Firestone until 1972, when he quit the company, and moved his family to the Santa Ynez Valley.

He represented the 35th District in the California State Assembly for two terms (1994–1998). In 1998, he ran for the United States House of Representatives to succeed the late Walter Capps, but lost the Republican nomination to Tom Bordonaro, who went on to lose the general election to Lois Capps, the widow of the prior incumbent. Firestone operated the San Antonio Ranch, Firestone Vineyard, Prosperity Wines, and other businesses.

His son, Adam, and his son-in-law, David Walker, run Firestone Walker Brewing Company; his other son, Andrew, appeared on ABC's show The Bachelor.

In the 2004 supervisor election, Firestone defeated John Buttny, Slick Gardner and Steve Pappas for the district seat. As Supervisor, Firestone has been criticized for his plan to get rid of the county's Oak Tree Protection ordinance, a historic 1998 compromise between agriculture and environmental interests.

In his personal life, Brooks Firestone has written and published three books, including the Valley Animals Series:
Valley Animals 2010 and More Valley Animals 2020, and the semi-autobiographical title, Evensong.
In 2020 these titles were published and re-distributed by Polyverse Publications.

References

External links
Third District office
Firestone Wine
HR 80 Assembly House Resolution
Join California - Brooks Firestone
Animals of the Valley - Santa Barbara News Press

1939 births
American businesspeople
American people of Austrian descent
Firestone family
Living people
Republican Party members of the California State Assembly
Wine merchants
County supervisors in California
Columbia College (New York) alumni